Bracciolini is a surname of Italian origin. Notable people with the surname include:

Francesco Bracciolini (1566-1645), Italian poet
Poggio Bracciolini (1380-1459), Italian scholar and Renaissance humanist

See also
Palazzo Bracciolini, Pistoia, a palace in Tuscany, Italy 
Terranuova Bracciolini, a comune in Tuscany, Italy